The sixth season of CSI: NY originally aired on CBS between September 2009 and May 2010. It consisted of 23 episodes. Its regular time slot continued on Wednesdays at 10pm/9c. The premiere, "Epilogue", concluded the story from the previous season's cliffhanger finale, "Pay Up".

Episode 7, "Hammer Down", was the second part of a three-part crossover with CSI: Miami and CSI: Crime Scene Investigation called CSI: Trilogy.

CSI: NY The Sixth Season was released on DVD in the U.S. on October 26, 2010.

Cast

Main cast
Gary Sinise as Mac Taylor
Melina Kanakaredes as Stella Bonasera
Carmine Giovinazzo as Danny Messer
Anna Belknap as Lindsay Monroe
Robert Joy as Sid Hammerback
A. J. Buckley as Adam Ross
Hill Harper as Sheldon Hawkes
Eddie Cahill as Don Flack

Recurring cast 
Claire Forlani as Peyton Driscoll
Kyle Gallner as Reed Garrett

Special guest star
Laurence Fishburne as Raymond Langston

Episodes

UK ratings
CSI: NY airs Saturday nights at various times on Five.

* Overnight ratings
a Broadcast as CSI Trilogy: NY
 In the UK episodes 20 and 21 were originally aired in reverse order. Episode 20 aired on May 29 at 9:30pm, while episode 21 aired the week before on the 22nd.

References

External links

CSI: NY Season 6 Episode List on Internet Movie Database
CSI: NY Season 6 Episode Guide on CSI Files
CSI: New York on CBS on The Futon Critic

2009 American television seasons
2010 American television seasons
06